A raven is any of several larger-bodied passerine bird species in the genus Corvus. These species do not form a single taxonomic group within the genus. There is no consistent distinction between "crows" and "ravens", common names which are assigned to different species chiefly based on their size.

The largest raven species are the common raven and the thick-billed raven; these are also the largest passerine species.

Etymology
The term "raven" originally referred to the common raven (Corvus corax), the type species of the genus Corvus, which has a larger distribution than any other species of Corvus, ranging over much of the Northern Hemisphere.

The modern English word raven has cognates in all other Germanic languages, including Old Norse (and subsequently modern Icelandic)  and Old High German , all of which descend from Proto-Germanic .

Collective nouns for a group of common ravens (if not all ravens) include "rave", "treachery", "unkindness", and "conspiracy". In practice, most people use the more generic "flock".

Extant species
 Corvus albicollis – White-necked raven (eastern and southern Africa)
 Corvus corax – Common raven (Northern Hemisphere)
 Corvus coronoides – Australian raven (Australia)
 Corvus crassirostris – Thick-billed raven (Horn of Africa)
 Corvus cryptoleucus – Chihuahuan raven (United States and Mexico)
 Corvus mellori – Little raven (southeastern Australia)
 Corvus rhipidurus – Fan-tailed raven (eastern Africa and Arabian peninsula)
 Corvus ruficollis – Brown-necked raven (northern Africa, Arabian peninsula, greater Middle East)
 Corvus tasmanicus – Forest raven (Tasmania, southern Victoria and north-east New South Wales in Australia)

Extinct species
 †Corvus moriorum – Chatham raven
 †Corvus antipodum – New Zealand raven
 †Corvus corax varius morpha leucophaeus – Pied raven

Gallery

See also
 Cultural depictions of ravens
 Ravens of the Tower of London

References

External links

 Raven videos on the Internet Bird Collection
 North American ravens on eNature